The voiced uvular fricative is a type of consonantal sound, used in some spoken languages. This consonant is one of the several collectively called guttural R when found in European languages.

Because the IPA symbol stands for the uvular fricative, the approximant may be specified by adding the downtack: , though some writings use a superscript , which is not an official IPA practice.

For a voiced pre-uvular fricative (also called post-velar), see voiced velar fricative.

Features
Features of the voiced uvular fricative:

 In many languages it is closer to an approximant, however, and no language distinguishes the two at the uvular articulation.

Occurrence

In Western Europe, a uvular trill pronunciation of rhotic consonants spread from northern French to several dialects and registers of Basque, Catalan, Danish, Dutch, German, Judaeo-Spanish, Norwegian, Occitan, Portuguese, Swedish, some variants of Low Saxon, and Yiddish. However, not all of them remain a uvular trill today.
In Brazilian Portuguese, it is usually a velar fricative, voiceless uvular fricative , or glottal transition, except in southern Brazil, where alveolar, velar and uvular trills as well as the voiced uvular fricative predominate. Because such uvular rhotics often do not contrast with alveolar ones, IPA transcriptions may often use  to represent them for ease of typesetting. For more information, see guttural R.

 note, "There is... a complication in the case of uvular fricatives in that the shape of the vocal tract may be such that the uvula vibrates."

It is also present in most Turkic languages, except for Turkish, and in Caucasian languages. It could also come in ɣ.

See also
 Index of phonetics articles
 Guttural

Notes

References

External links
 

Approximant-fricative consonants
Uvular consonants
Pulmonic consonants
Voiced oral consonants
Central consonants